Club Deportivo Choco de Redondela is a Spanish football club based in Redondela, province of Pontevedra, Galicia, Spain. Founded in 1953, the team currently plays in Tercera División RFEF – Group 1. The club's home ground is Campo Municipal de Santa Mariña.

Season to season

14 seasons in Tercera División
1 season in Tercera División RFEF

References

External links
Official website
Futbolme.com profile

Football clubs in Galicia (Spain)
Association football clubs established in 1953
1953 establishments in Spain